Songbird is a compilation album of songs by American singer Eva Cassidy. It was released through Blix Street on May 19, 1998, two years after her death in 1996.

Five tracks ("Wade in the Water", "Wayfaring Stranger", "Songbird", "Time is a Healer" and "I Know You by Heart") are from Cassidy's album Eva by Heart. Four tracks ("Fields of Gold", "Autumn Leaves", "People Get Ready" and "Oh Had I a Golden Thread") are from her album Live at Blues Alley. The remaining track, "Over the Rainbow", is from the album The Other Side. The compilation album was certified Gold by the CRIA (50,000 units) in 2003. It was certified Gold by the RIAA in 2001 and Platinum in 2008 for shipments in excess of one million copies.

In 2018, a twentieth anniversary edition of the album was released, titled Songbird 20.

Background
In May 1996, Eva Cassidy released the live album Live at Blues Alley, which would be the last album released before her death six months later, at the age of 33. Near the end of Cassidy's life, local folk singer Grace Griffith sent a copy of the album to Bill Straw, the head of her label, Blix Street Records.

"It didn't take a genius to figure it out," Straw told The New York Times. "The moment I listened to that tape, I knew this was one of the best singers I'd ever heard."

Straw approached the Cassidy family to put together a new album. In 1998, a compilation of tracks from Cassidy's three released recordings was assembled into what would become Songbird. This CD lingered in relative obscurity for two years until it was given airplay by Terry Wogan on his wide-reaching BBC Radio 2 show Wake Up to Wogan, following recommendation by his producer Paul Walters. The album sold more an additional 100,000 copies in the following months. The New York Times spoke of her "silken soprano voice with a wide and seemingly effortless range, unerring pitch and a gift for phrasing that at times was heart-stoppingly eloquent."

Chart performance
The album was originally released in 1998, eighteen months on from Cassidy's death. At this point, she was virtually unknown in the United Kingdom, and Songbird only charted in the nether-regions of the UK Albums Chart. Two years after the album's release, however, Cassidy's music was brought to the attention of British audiences when her versions of "Fields of Gold" and "Over the Rainbow" were played by Mike Harding and Terry Wogan on BBC Radio 2. Following an overwhelming response, a camcorder recording of "Over the Rainbow", taken at Blues Alley in Georgetown, Washington, D.C. by her friend Bryan McCulley, was shown on BBC Two's Top of the Pops 2. Shortly afterwards, Songbird climbed to the top of the UK Albums Chart. It ended up being the eighth-biggest-selling album of 2001, and it has subsequently been certified 6× Platinum by the British Phonographic Industry (BPI) and has worldwide sales in excess of 5 million copies.

Track listing

Original version

Songbird 20 version

The tracks from Live at Blues Alley sound like studio cuts because Cassidy's stage patter and the audience applause have been removed.

Personnel
 Eva Cassidy – guitar, keyboards, vocals, producer, arranger
 Chris Biondo – bass, rhythm guitar, producer, drum programming
 Dan Cassidy – violin
 Hilton Felton – organ
 John Gillespie – organ
 Keith Grimes – lead electric guitar
 Raice McLeod – drums
 Larry Melton – upright bass
 Mike Stein – violin
 Chris Walker – trumpet
 Lenny Williams – piano
 Kent Wood – organ, producer

Charts and certifications

Weekly charts

Year-end charts

Decade-end charts

Certifications

Release history

References

Eva Cassidy albums
1998 compilation albums